Good Times is a studio album by American recording artist Wanda Jackson. It was released in 1980 via Deep Sea Music and contained ten tracks. The album was Jackson's twenty sixth studio disc and her first to be released on a label outside the United States. It included a mixture of new tracks and re-recordings. The album's lead single was a cover of "Don't Let the Good Times Fool You".

Background
Wanda Jackson had become known to audiences through a series of Rockabilly, Country and gospel music audiences through hit singles like "Let's Have a Party", "In the Middle of a Heartache", and "The Box It Came In". By the late 1970s, Jackson had temporarily retreated into domestic life but continued occasionally recording music.

Content
In 1980, businessman Mervyn Conn enlisted Jackson to record for his British-based Deep Sea Music label. Conn explained in the liner notes that Jackson had become "a major artist in U.K. country music" and he felt it fitting to have her be his first artist on the label. A total of ten tracks were recorded for the album, which were cut on May 15, 1980 in Nashville, Tennessee alongside producer Gary S. Paxton. For the project, Jackson re-recorded the songs "Silver Threads and Golden Needles", "Right or Wrong" and "Grandma Sang Off-Key". Original tracks were also featured, including her self-penned "My Umbrella".

Release and singles
Good Times was released in 1980 on Deep Sea Music. It became Jackson's twenty sixth studio album and her first to be released outside of the United States. It was sold exclusively to markets in the United Kingdom. The project was originally issued as a vinyl LP, containing five songs on both sides of the record. In 1987, the album was released in Switzerland as a compact disc via Montana Country. The disc included one single release. In 1980, Jackson's cover of Melba Montgomery's "Don't Let the Good Times Fool You" was released on the Deep Sea label, backed with "My Umbrella" on the B-side.

Track listings

Vinyl version

CD version

Release history

References

1980 albums
Wanda Jackson albums